Dr Giora Yoseftal (9 August 1912 – 23 August 1962) was an Israeli politician who held several ministerial portfolios in the late 1950s and early 1960s.

Biography
Born Georg Josephthal in Nuremberg in Germany, Yoseftal was a member of the Yiddisher Yudenbund youth movement in his teens. After high school he studied law and economics at the University of Heidelberg, Berlin, Munich and Basel, gaining a PhD in jurisprudence at the latter.

In 1932, he joined Habonim, and the following year was appointed head of the youth department of the Bavarian Jewish community. He moved to Berlin in 1934, and two years later was elected secretary general of the German branch of HeHalutz. In 1936 he married Senetta Yoseftal, later also an Israeli politician.

Yoseftal made aliyah to Mandate Palestine in 1938, and two months after arriving, he was sent to London to try to save German Jewry. He returned to Palestine in 1939, establishing a work brigade in Ra'anana, which later founded kibbutz Gal'ed in 1945.

In 1943, he joined the British Army. After the war ended, he took over the absorption section of the Jewish Agency's aliyah department. Between 1947 and 1952 he sat on the Agency's board. In 1952 he was a member of the delegations which negotiated the Reparations Agreement between Israel and the Federal Republic of Germany.

In 1956, he became secretary-general of Mapai, the ruling party, a role he held until 1959. In the elections that year he was voted into the Knesset on Mapai's list, and was appointed Minister of Labour. He retained his seat in the 1961 elections, and was given the roles of Minister of Housing and Minister of Development. He died in office on 23 August 1962.

In March 2018, the city of Netanya decided to change the name of a street named after Yoseftal because of his discriminatory policies towards North African immigrants in the 1950s.

The Yoseftal Medical Center in Eilat is named for him; he was instrumental in its construction and location but did not live to see it opened.

References

External links

 
 The personal papers of Giora Yoseftal are kept at the   Central Zionist Archives in Jerusalem. The notation of the record group is A344.
 

1912 births
1962 deaths
Jewish emigrants from Nazi Germany to Mandatory Palestine
Heads of the Jewish Agency for Israel
Heidelberg University alumni
Humboldt University of Berlin alumni
Jewish Israeli politicians
Ludwig Maximilian University of Munich alumni
Mapai politicians
Members of the 4th Knesset (1959–1961)
Members of the 5th Knesset (1961–1965)
Members of the Assembly of Representatives (Mandatory Palestine)
Politicians from Nuremberg
Spouses of Israeli politicians
University of Basel alumni
Ministers of Development of Israel
Ministers of Housing of Israel
Ministers of Labour of Israel